Sant Llorenç del Munt is a largely rocky mountain massif in central Catalonia, Spain. Montcau  is another important peak of the massif. On the massif, there is a protected area under the name Parc Natural de Sant Llorenç del Munt i l'Obac.

See also
Mountains of Catalonia
Catalan symbols

References

External links
Parc natural de Sant Llorenç del Munt i l'Obac
Rev. Anton Vergés i Mirassó «Sant Llorens del Munt: son passat, son present y venider», Barcelona 1871

Rock formations of Catalonia
Mountains of Catalonia
Bages
Vallès Occidental